The 20th-century German Nazi Party made extensive use of graphic symbols, especially the swastika, notably in the form of the swastika flag, which became the co-national flag of Nazi Germany in 1933, and the sole national flag in 1935. A very similar flag had represented the Party beginning in 1920.

Swastika

The Nazis' principal symbol was the swastika, which the newly established Nazi Party formally adopted in 1920. The emblem was a black swastika (卐) rotated 45 degrees on a white circle on a red background. This insignia was used on the party's flag, badge, and armband. Similar shaped swastikas were seen in United States postcards wishing people good luck in the early 1900s.

The black-white-red motif is based on the colours of the flags of the German Empire. This colour scheme was commonly associated with anti-Weimar German nationalists, following the fall of the German Empire. The Nazis denounced the black-red-gold flag of the Weimar republic (the current flag of Germany).

In , Adolf Hitler described the symbolism of the Nazi flag: "The red expressed the social thought underlying the movement. White the national thought. And the swastika signified the mission allotted to us—the struggle for the victory of Aryan mankind and at the same time the triumph of the ideal of creative work ..."

Today, certain countries such as Germany (see  section 86a), Austria, France, Lithuania, Latvia, Poland, Russia, Ukraine, Brazil, China and Israel have banned Nazi symbols and it is considered a criminal offence if they are displayed publicly for non-educational purposes. On August 9, 2018, Germany lifted the ban on the usage of swastikas and other Nazi symbols in video games. "Through the change in the interpretation of the law, games that critically look at current affairs can for the first time be given a USK age rating", USK managing director Elisabeth Secker told CTV. "This has long been the case for films and with regards to the freedom of the arts, this is now rightly also the case with computer and videogames."

Heraldry

Under the Nazi regime, government bodies were encouraged to remove religious symbolism from their heraldry. Symbols such as crosses, saints, etc. were seen as upsetting to the Nazis; however, few German councils actually changed their often ancient symbols. Some, however, did, including Coburg, which replaced the Maure on their arms with a sword and swastika, and Thuringia, which added a swastika to the paws of their lion.

Nazi occultist Karl Maria Wiligut believed that heraldry began in the world of the Germanic gods, and was created by Wotan, the god of war. This was influenced by the pre-Nazi occultist Guido von List, who held the same belief about heraldry.

Runic letters
Letters of the historical runic alphabet and the modern Armanen runes have been used by Nazism and neo-Nazi groups that associate themselves with Germanic traditions, mainly the Sigel, Eihwaz, Tyr; c.f. Odal (see Odalism) and Algiz runes.

The fascination that runes seem to have exerted on the Nazis can be traced to the occult and  author , one of the important figures in Germanic mysticism and runic revivalism in the late 19th and early 20th centuries.

In Nazi contexts, the s-rune is referred to as "Sig" (after List, probably from Anglo-Saxon ). The ", while not a rune historically, has the shape of List's "Gibor" rune. Runic "SS" was the symbol of the Schutzstaffel.

Food as symbol
In 1997, Wolfgang Fröhlich, Holocaust denier and former district council member for the Freedom Party, alleged that Adolf Hitler's favorite food was egg dumplings. Some restaurants in Austria started advertising the dish as a "daily special" for the 20th of April, which is Hitler's date of birth. Accordingly, many neofascists have taken to celebrate Hitler's birthday by eating Eiernockerl, though the allegation about the dish has never been historically confirmed.

Other symbols

Other symbols employed by the Nazis include:

 The eagle atop swastika (German: Reichsadler), the formal symbol of the Nazi Party
 The SS bolts, the runic insignia of the 
 Various runes from the runic script, such as the Odal/Othala, Algiz/Leben, Tyr/Tiwaz runes and other rune-like symbols such as the 
 The black SS uniform
 The brown shirts of the 
 The Black Sun (German: Schwarze Sonne/Sonnenrad) used by Heinrich Himmler of the SS.
 The crossed hammer and sword of Strasserism, a strand of Nazism that has a Third Positionist ideology.
 The broken sun cross swastika.
The Celtic cross, which was originally a symbol used to represent pre-Christian and Christian European groups such as the Irish, has been used since World War II by many neo-Nazi groups.

Usages by neo-Nazi groups
Many symbols used by the Nazis have further been appropriated by neo-Nazi groups, including a number of runes.

Neo-Nazis however also employ various number symbols such as:

 18, code for Adolf Hitler. The number comes from the position of the letters in the alphabet: A = 1, H = 8.
 88, code for 88 Precepts. A manifesto written by David Lane, a late 20th-century American white supremacist, on the proper organization of a white nationalist nation, 88 Precepts is a treatise on natural law, religion and politics. However, according to the Anti-Defamation League, it is code for Heil Hitler. Again, the number comes from the position of the letter H in the Latin alphabet.
 14, from the Fourteen Words coined by David Lane: "We must secure the existence of our people and a future for white children."
 14 and 88 are sometimes combined with each other (i.e. 14/88, 8814, 1488). They are also sometimes depicted on dice.

Gallery

See also

 Fascist symbolism
 Rising Sun Flag#Controversy
 Flags of Germany
 Fylfot
 Germanic Paganism
 List of symbols designated by the Anti-Defamation League as hate symbols
 Nazi memorabilia
 Runes
 Runic insignia of the Schutzstaffel
 Strafgesetzbuch section 86a
 Bans on Nazi symbols
 Swastika
 Symbols of Francoism
 Symbols of Germany
 Uniforms and insignia of the Schutzstaffel
 Western use of the swastika in the early 20th century

References

External links
 Hate on Display: A Visual Database of Extremist Symbols, Logos and Tattoos
 A collection of forbidden Nazi symbols and emblems of various groups 
 Symbols used by white supremacists 
 "New Book Reveals Secret Meaning of Neo-Nazi Codes"
 "These are the new symbols of hate"

 
Fascist symbols
Swastika